Michelle McIlveen MLA (born 21 January 1971) is a Unionist politician from Northern Ireland representing the Democratic Unionist Party (DUP). She was elected to the Northern Ireland Assembly as a Democratic Unionist Party member for Strangford in 2007. She has been General Secretary of the DUP since 2008. She served as Minister for Education from June 2021 to October 2022

Early life and education

A native of Newtownards, she attended Methodist College Belfast and later Queen's University, Belfast where she took a Master's Degree in Irish Politics and later still a Postgraduate Certificate in Education, the necessary qualification to teach in most parts of the United Kingdom.  

She taught History and Politics at Grosvenor Grammar School in East Belfast for a number of years before entering full-time politics.

Political career
McIlveen was first elected as a councillor to Ards Borough Council in 2005. She then became an MLA for Strangford in 2007, a seat she has held since. Her constituency office is in Comber.

McIlveen became the Junior Minister in the Office of the First Minister and Deputy First Minister on 11 May 2015 until 28 October 2015.

She became the Minister for Regional Development on 21 September 2015. This post had been held by the Ulster Unionist Party (UUP) minister Danny Kennedy until his party withdrew from the Northern Ireland Executive, and under the D'Hondt method the department was transferred to the DUP. McIlveen was appointed as minister for this department, with Emma Little-Pengelly replacing her as Junior Minister.

McIlveen then served as the Minister of Agriculture, Environment, and Rural Affairs from 2016 until the collapse of the Northern Ireland Executive in January 2017.

On 14 June 2021, McIlveen, a former teacher, was appointed as the Minister for Education by the DUP leader Edwin Poots. She remained in the post under Sir Jeffrey Donaldson's leadership.

Notes

References

External links
NI Assembly (MLA Profile)
DUP website

1971 births
Living people
Alumni of Queen's University Belfast
Members of Ards Borough Council
Ministers of the Northern Ireland Executive (since 1999)
Junior ministers of the Northern Ireland Assembly (since 1999)
Democratic Unionist Party MLAs
Northern Ireland MLAs 2007–2011
Northern Ireland MLAs 2011–2016
Northern Ireland MLAs 2016–2017
Northern Ireland MLAs 2017–2022
Female members of the Northern Ireland Assembly
People educated at Methodist College Belfast
Politicians from Belfast
Women ministers of the Northern Ireland Executive
Women councillors in Northern Ireland
Northern Ireland MLAs 2022–2027